The Lindsay String Quartet (or The Lindsays) was a British string quartet from 1965 to 2005.

History
The quartet first performed at the Royal Academy of Music in 1965 to compete for a prize and set out to make the string quartets of Bartók and Beethoven the centre of their repertoire. In 1967, the quartet was appointed to be Leverhulme Scholars at Keele University, and in 1970, it changed its name from the Cropper to the Lindsay String Quartet, naming itself after Lord Lindsay, the founder of Keele University. 1971 brought a change in second violin to Ronald Birks. The quartet gained a Gramophone Award for the Late Beethoven Quartets in 1984. Roger Bigley left the quartet in 1985 to be replaced by Robin Ireland. Bigley then became assistant principal viola of the BBC Philharmonic orchestra before becoming assistant head of strings at the RNCM.

In 1974, they became Quartet-in-Residence at Sheffield University and five years later held a similar position at Manchester University, where they performed a regular concert season, directed seminars, and coached chamber ensembles. The quartet presented festivals each year at the Studio Theatre in the Crucible Theatre, Sheffield, which featured many famous local and international musicians, and travelled widely throughout the world.

In 2005, after 39 years, the quartet announced their intended retirement the following year. They then performed a very successful series of farewell concerts throughout the world, culminating in four final concerts in their home town of Sheffield in July 2005.  Individual members afterwards pursued separate musical ideas.

The quartet have produced an extensive list of recordings, including a highly acclaimed Beethoven cycle, and substantial parts of the Haydn, Mozart, Schubert and Dvorak repertoires.

In 2019, a book titled A Quintessential Quartet: The Story of the Lindsay String Quartet was written by Bernard Gregor-Smith, one of the founding members of the Lindsay String Quartet.

Leader Peter Cropper (19 November 1945 – 29 May 2015) was the founding Artistic Director of Music in the Round, a charitable organisation he founded in the 1980s, that promotes chamber music concerts in Sheffield and nationally. The Lindsays formed the core of Music in the Round's activity for over twenty years, until their retirement. Cropper died suddenly in 2015 aged 69.

Members
Peter Cropper (first violin)
Michael Adamson (second violin, 196571)
Ronald Birks (second violin, 19712005)
Roger Bigley (viola, 196585)
Robin Ireland (viola, 19852005)
Bernard Gregor-Smith (cello)

Awards
Gramophone Award - 1984

Honorary Doctorate - Keele University, 1986 

Honorary Doctorate - Sheffield Hallam University, 1990 

Honorary Doctorate - University of Leicester, 1998 

Honorary Doctorate - University of Sheffield, 2001 

Honorary Doctorate - University of Manchester, 2005

Books
A Quintessential Quartet: The Story of the Lindsay String Quartet written by Bernard Gregor-Smith

Art
The Lindsay String Quartet (Peter Cropper; Ronald Birks; Robin Ireland; Bernard Gregor-Smith) Hanging in The National Portrait Gallery, London, United Kingdom | by György Gordon | oil on canvas, 2003 | Primary Collection | NPG 6649

ASV Lindsay String Quartet discography
BEETHOVEN: String Quartets "Rasumovsky" No.7, Nos.8 & 9 CD DCA 553, 554 

BEETHOVEN: String Quartets Nos.12-16 & Grosse Fuge CD DCA 601, 602, 603 & 604

BEETHOVEN: String Quartets (The New Cycle):
Opus 18, Nos. 1, 2 & 3 CD DCA 1111
Opus 18, Nos. 4/5. Opus 14. CD DCA 1112
Opus 18, No. 6. Quintet Op.29. CD DCA 1113
Opus 59, "Razumovsky" Nos. 1 & 3 CD DCA 1114
Opus 59, No.2 and Opus 74. CD DCA 1115
Opus 95, Opus 127. CD DCA 1116
Op.130 & Grosse Fuge Op.133 CD DCA 1117
Op.132 & Quintet Op.104 CD DCA 1118
Op.131 & Op.135 CD DCA 1119

BARTOK: String Quartets  
Nos. 1 & 2 DCA 510
Nos. 3 & 4 DCA 509
Nos. 5 & 6 DCA 504

BORODIN:

String Quartets Nos. 1+2, String Sextet (with L. Williams, R. Wallfisch) CD DCA 1143

BRAHMS / SCHUMANN: 

Piano Quintets (with P. Frankl) CD DCA 728

MENDELSSOHN : String Quartet No. 6 & BRAHMS : String Quartet No. 2 CD QS 6173

HAYDN: The Seven Last Words CD DCA 853

HAYDN: String Quartets “Sun” Op.20 - Nos.1, 3 & 4 CD DCA 1027

HAYDN: String Quartets “Sun” Op.20 - Nos.2, 5 & 6 CD DCA 1057

HAYDN: String Quartets Op.33 - Nos.1, 2 "The Joke"& 4 CD DCA 937

HAYDN: String Quartets Op.33 - Nos.3 "The Bird",5 & 6 CD DCA 938

HAYDN: The 3 String Quartets Op.54 "Tost I" CD DCA 582

HAYDN: The 3 String Quartets Op.55 CD DCA 906

HAYDN: The 3 String Quartets Op.64 (part 1) CD DCA 1083

HAYDN: The 3 String Quartets Op.64 (part 2) CD DCA 1084

HAYDN: The 3 String Quartets Op.76 (part 1) CD DCA 1076

HAYDN: The 3 String Quartets Op.76 (part 2) CD DCA 1077

Haydn: String Quartets Op.50 Nos. 1-3 CD GLD 4007

Haydn: String Quartets Op.50 Nos. 4-6 CD GLD 4008

Haydn: String Quartets Op.74 Nos. 1-3 CD GLD 40132

Hadyn: String Quartets Op.77 Nos. 1-2, Op.42, Op.103 CD GLD 40102

MOZART: Quartet K387 / String Quintet K516 CD DCA 923

MOZART: Quartet K458 "The Hunt" / Horn Quintet / Oboe Quartet CD DCA 968 

MOZART: Quartet K428 / String Quintet K515 CD DCA 992

MOZART: Quartet K421 / String Quintet K593 CD DCA 1018

MOZART: Clarinet Quintet/String Quintet K464 CDDCA 1042

MOZART: Quartet K465 / String Quintet K614 CD DCA 1069

RAVEL & DEBUSSY: String Quartets / STRAVINSKY: 3 Pieces CD DCA 930

SCHUBERT:String Quintet (with Douglas Cummings - cello) CD DCA 537

SCHUBERT:String Quartets Nos.8 & 13 "Rosamunde" CD DCA 593

SCHUBERT:String Quartets Nos.12 & 14 "Death and the Maiden" CD DCA 560

SCHUBERT:String Quartet No.15 CD DCA 661

TIPPETT: String Quartet No.4 / BRITTEN: String Quartet No.3 CD DCA 608

"THE BOHEMIANS"

JANACEK: The 2 String Quartets "Kreutzer Sonata" & "Intimate Letters" / DVORAK: Cypresses CD DCA 749

SMETANA: The 2 String Quartets / DVORAK: Romance & 2 Waltzes CD DCA 777

DVORAK: String Quartets Nos.10 & 14 CD DCA 788 

DVORAK: String Quartets Nos.12 "The American" & 13 CD DCA 797

DVORAK: Bagatelles / String Quintet "The American" CD DCA 806

DVORAK & MARTINU: Piano Quintets (with Peter Frankl - piano) CD DCA 889

References
Bigley, Roger (1981). Beethoven String Quartets Op.59 'Razumovsky', CD liner notes. Academy Sound and Vision Ltd.

External links

Member links
Peter Cropper
Ronald Birks 
Robin Ireland 
Bernard Gregor-Smith

Tributes
 Music in the Round's Tribute to Peter Cropper

Music and videos
BBC Omnibus Episode, 1977
Beethoven String Quartet in B-flat major, Op. 130 - 5. Cavatina
The Lindsays YouTube Channel

Musical groups established in 1965
Musical groups disestablished in 2005
English string quartets
1965 establishments in the United Kingdom
2005 disestablishments in the United Kingdom